Gramberg is a surname. Notable people with the surname include:

Carl Peter Wilhelm Gramberg (1797–1830), German theologian and biblical scholar
Jan Simon Gerardus Gramberg (1823–1888), Dutch author, military physician, plantation owner and adventurer
Liliana Gramberg (1921–1996), Italian-born American printmaker and painter

See also 
Gramberg Ranch, in Pennington County (South Dakota near Hermosa) was listed on the National Register of Historic Places in 1999